The Genesis Group is an auxiliary organization of the Church of Jesus Christ of Latter-day Saints (LDS church) for African-American members and their families.

History
LDS Church leaders Thomas Monson, Gordon B. Hinckley, and Boyd K. Packer established the Genesis Group with Ruffin Bridgeforth, Eugene Orr, and Darius Gray on June 8, 1971 in Salt Lake City, Utah. It was first organized to provide members an organization where they could affiliate with fellow African-American members.

The Genesis group provided meetings for black members of the LDS church; specifically, Relief Society, Primary, Young Men, Young Women and testimony meetings. Members of Genesis were still expected to attend Sunday meetings in their home wards, which at the time were sacrament meeting, Priesthood meetings, and Sunday School. It was like a branch, a small group of members, but without priesthood authority. The group was led by Ruffin Bridgeforth from 1971 through 1978. Shortly after the church's June 8, 1978, announcement of the revelation extending the priesthood to all worthy male members of the church, the group's attendance dropped, and officially discontinued in 1987. Participation decreased in part because it added additional time commitments to already demanding LDS church membership. In 1985, Marva Collins started a "Genesis II" group in Oakland, California and published a newsletter focused on news about black Mormons until 1988.

The Genesis Group was reorganized in 1996, based on a perception that African Americans still had unique issues and could benefit from a chance to affiliate with one another. Leaders of the group include Darius Gray (1997–2003), Don Harwell (2003–2018), and Davis Stovall (2018-present). Stake and High Councilmen were assigned to represent The Genesis Group in local organization, and a General authority was assigned to be a liaison to the group.

Other Genesis groups have existed in Washington, D.C. In 2007, similar support groups existed in Hattiesburg, Mississippi, Cincinnati and Columbus, Ohio, Los Angeles,  and Houston. The Genesis Group meets on the first Sunday of every month in Salt Lake City.

See also

1978 Revelation on Priesthood
Black Mormons
Black people and early Mormonism
Black people in Mormon doctrine
Black people and Mormonism

References

External links
 Genesis Facebook Group

African-American history of Utah
Organizational subdivisions of the Church of Jesus Christ of Latter-day Saints
Christian organizations established in 1971
Mormonism and race
African-American Latter Day Saints
1971 establishments in Utah
Latter Day Saint culture
Harold B. Lee Library-related 20th century articles